Scratch to Reveal was released by Kenyan house/funk trio Just A Band in 2008.

Combining features of disco, funk and electronica, this was the first studio album by the Kenyan trio. The album includes "Oh Ndio", a remix of a song by defunct Kenyan pop group Five Alive.

Album information
Scratch to Reveal was initially slated for a May 10, 2007 release. This release date was pushed to May 17.

The album starts off with the disco/house vibes of "Fly" and "Oh Ndio", explores softer acoustic tones towards the middle and returns to the disco feel with "Lights*Music*Stars". "Iwinyo Piny" appears as a bonus track, and a hidden track appears at the end of the album.

Reception
Scratch to Reveal received generally positive reviews, garnering a five-star rating from WAPI Times, who described it as "full of dancy house gems laced with a little bit of industrial techno and drum and bass." Drum Magazine called it "a break from tradition, the trio have done a record completely devoid of the usual pseudo-reggae influences...truly avant-garde." Adam Magazine called it "a pleasant departure from usual Kenyan music."
Just A Band's Single "Hey", off the album Scratch To Reveal was released on October 22, 2008. It was first played on Citizen TV's Power Breakfast. Hey is a powerful song with a powerful track and out of the ordinary actors to back it. The story of an ordinary guy, missing his girlfriend is portrayed by two puppets 'Boflo' and 'Katunge'. Boflo is professing his undying love for Katunge and calls all other girls 'Kadhalika' which roughly translated means etc...

Track listing
 "Fly" – 3:52
 "Oh Ndio" – 3:28
 "Maro Pa More" – 3:24
 "FunkyFineBeautiful" – 3:24
 "Do You Mind" – 2:39
 "Hey!" – 3:49
 "Bye Bye" – 3:54
 "If I Could" – 3:05
 "Twende Kazi" – 3:47
 "Have You Seen Her?"  – 3:20
 "Lights*Music*Stars" - 3:51
 "Iwinyo Piny" (bonus track) - 3:34
 "Beba Na Finje" (hidden track) - 1:29

Personnel

Production

References

External links 
just-a-band.com (Official website)

Just a Band albums
2008 albums